Chavukkadi Chandrakantha is a 1960 Indian Tamil language film directed by M. Radhakrishnan. The film stars T. S. Balaiah and Sowkar Janaki.

Plot

Cast 
The following list is adapted from the database of Film News Anandan

Male cast
T. S. Balaiah
T. K. Ramachandran
Jagadheesan
Veerappa
Radhakrishnan

Female cast
Sowcar Janaki
Vanaja
Tambaram Lalitha

Production 
The film was produced and directed by M. Radhakrishnan under the banner Aruna Films. The story was written by J. Rangaraj and A. L. Narayanan wrote the dialogues. Cinematography was done by N. Prabhakar while the editing was done by B. V. Manickam. Art direction was by C. Ramraj. A. K. Chopra, Chinni Sampath handled the choreography. Still photography was done by R. N. Rangaraja Rao.

Soundtrack 
The music was composed by G. Ramanathan while the lyrics were penned by A. Maruthakasi, A. L. Narayanan, Udumalai Narayana Kavi, Ka. Mu. Sheriff and Ku. Ma. Balasubramaniam. Playback singers are P. Leela, A. G. Rathnamala, P. Susheela, K. Jamuna Rani, Soolamangalam Rajalakshmi, K. Rani, P. B. Srinivas and Thiruchi Loganathan.

References

External links 
 

1960s Tamil-language films